Corazón (formerly Azteca Novelas and Az Corazón) is a Mexican pay television channel owned by TV Azteca Internacional TV de Paga (TV Azteca), was founded as Azteca Novelas in 2008 as a channel that would retransmit telenovelas previously broadcast on Azteca Uno.

Availability 

References

External links 
  

Latin American cable television networks
Television networks in Mexico
TV Azteca pay television networks